Thomas Birdsall Jackson (March 24, 1797 – April 23, 1881) was an American lawyer and politician who served two terms as a U.S. Representative from New York from 1837 to 1841.

Biography 
Born in Jerusalem, Long Island, New York, Jackson attended the public schools. He engaged in agricultural pursuits. He studied law. He was admitted to the bar and practiced in Jerusalem, Hempstead, and Newtown, New York.

Family 
Thomas married Marie Coles and had three known children: Samuel, Andrew and William. Thomas descends from the prominent Jackson family of Hempstead, New York.

Congress 
Jackson was elected county judge in 1832. He served as member of the State assembly 1833–1835. He moved to Newtown, Long Island, New York, in 1835. He served as a Justice of the Peace. Jackson was elected as a Democrat to the Twenty-fifth and Twenty-sixth Congresses (March 4, 1837 – March 3, 1841). He was not a candidate for renomination in 1840.

Later career and death 
He resumed agricultural pursuits. He died in Newtown (now Elmhurst Station), Flushing, Long Island, New York, April 23, 1881. He was interred in Flushing Cemetery.

Sources

1797 births
1881 deaths
Democratic Party members of the United States House of Representatives from New York (state)
New York (state) state court judges
Democratic Party members of the New York State Assembly
19th-century American politicians
19th-century American judges